The 35th Goya Awards ceremony, presented by the Academy of Cinematographic Arts and Sciences (AACCE), honored the best in Spanish films of 2020 and took place at the Teatro del Soho CaixaBank in Málaga on 6 March 2021. The ceremony was televised in Spain by Televisión Española (TVE) and was directed and hosted by actor Antonio Banderas and journalist María Casado. It was also televised for the international public by the TVE Internacional channel. It was the second consecutive year that the ceremony was held in Málaga. It was also the third consecutive year that the ceremony took place in Andalusia.

Due to the ongoing COVID-19 pandemic, the hosts, award presenters and music performers were present on-site, while the nominees appeared from remote locations.

Due to the impact of the COVID-19 pandemic on cinema, the eligibility criteria were modified to account for films that could not have a theatrical release and were released on streaming instead. Nominations were scheduled to be read in Madrid on 11 January 2021, but the announcement was postponed to January 18 due to the disruption caused by Storm Filomena. Nominations were read by actress and singer Ana Belén and actor and comedian Dani Rovira. Adú received the most nominations with thirteen, followed by Coven and Schoolgirls, with nine nominations a piece, and Rosa's Wedding, with eight nominations.

Schoolgirls won Best Film, as well as Best Original Screenplay, Best New Director, and Best Cinematography. Adú also won four awards, most notably Best Director and Best New Actor. Coven won the most awards, with five awards.

Winners and nominees 
Nominees are listed as follows. Winners are listed first, highlighted in boldface.

Major awards

Other award nominees

Honorary Goya
 Ángela Molina

Films with multiple nominations and awards

Presenters and performers 
The following individuals, listed in order of appearance, presented awards or performed musical numbers.

Presenters

Performers

References

External links
Official site

35
2020 film awards
2020 in Spanish cinema
2020s in Andalusia
March 2021 events in Spain